Chamanrang (also Romanized as Chaman Rang; also known as Rang) is a village in Qaleh Asgar Rural District, Lalehzar District, Bardsir County, Kerman Province, Iran. At the 2006 census, its population was 74, in 19 families.

References 

Populated places in Bardsir County